Goal of the century may refer to:

 FIFA World Cup Goal of the Century (20th century), a football goal scored by Diego Maradona at the 1986 FIFA World Cup in Mexico for Argentina against England
 Sportschau Goal of the Century, a football award given by Sportschau German TV channel
 Wembley Goal of the Century (20th c.), at the 1981 FA Cup Final
 Irish National Football League Goal of the Century (20th c.), in the 1956–57 National Football League (Ireland)
 Ice hockey Goal of the Century (20th c.), see 1972 in sports

See also

 Goal of the Decade
 Goal of the Year (disambiguation)
 Goal of the Season (disambiguation)
 Goal of the Month (disambiguation)
 Game of the Century (disambiguation)
 Player of the century
 Team of the century
 
 Century (disambiguation)
 Goal (disambiguation)